A number of ships have been named Anglo-Norse, including:

Ship names